The 1931 Limerick Senior Hurling Championship was the 37th staging of the Limerick Senior Hurling Championship since its establishment by the Limerick County Board.

Young Irelands were the defending champions.

On 4 October 1931, Ahane won the championship after a 5-05 to 1-04 defeat of Croom in the final. It was their first ever championship title.

Results

Final

References

Limerick Senior Hurling Championship
Limerick Senior Hurling Championship